The Young Baron Neuhaus (German: Der junge Baron Neuhaus) is a 1934 German historical drama film directed by Gustav Ucicky and starring Viktor de Kowa, Käthe von Nagy and Christl Mardayn. Produced and distributed by UFA, it was shot at the company's Babelsberg Studios in Berlin and on location around Vienna. The film's sets were designed by the art directors Robert Herlth and Walter Röhrig.

Plot
Vienna, 1753. The young Empress Maria Theresa wants to be a shining example for her compatriots, whose morality worries her. Above all, "window-slinging" young men, i.e. those gentlemen who enter the sleeping rooms of presumably chaste, innocent, young ladies at night, arouse her anger. The monarch therefore plans to urgently change something about this "bad habit" and is looking for morally stable allies for her project.

One day, Her Majesty is recommended the supposedly modest Baron Neuhaus, on whom her lady-in-waiting, Countess Christl Palm, has cast an eye. In order to score points with the Empress, the young Baron Neuhaus follows some of the advice of the young Toni, who serves as a chambermaid for Countess Palm. Baron Neuhaus wants to thank Toni for this one night and climbs through an open window into a room where chambermaid is laying. When a guard notices the open window and footprints leading to the room, he sounds an alarm. With difficulty and hardship, Neuhaus is able to escape and hides in a barrel. Promptly it starts to pour, the barrel fills up, and the young Baron Neuhaus becomes soaking wet. On the way home, he accidentally leaves behind a robe borrowed from Toni, which her uncle, the K.u.K. stove heater Stockel, a well-laved, small man of advanced age.

As a result, the case provokes an open discussion in the highest circles. The Empress suspects that this is another moral monster and, on the advice of Countess Palm, commissions Baron Neuhaus, of all people, who is appointed judge, to investigate this case. The poor, innocent Stockel becomes the center of the suspicion due to the coat that he left behind. Neuhaus eventually confesses to Countess Christl that he himself was the "sinner". After the confession to the countess, he then goes to the empress to admit his guilt. Christl arrives and claims that Neuhaus climbed into Toni's room to get to her from there. He had allowed him to do so, and everything had been done perfectly modestly. Maria Theresa, who at the time was receiving the homages on the occasion of her birthday, commissions to hold a great equestrian festival. Following the completion of the tournament, Christl is awarded a ring. By the ancient tradition, the winner is allowed to pass the ring on to the man she loves. And so Baron Neuhaus becomes the next barer of the jewel and can therefore soon free the Countess, which creates a scandal in the Empress's chambers, but is being quilled.

Cast
Viktor de Kowa as Baron Neuhaus
Käthe von Nagy as Countess Christl Palm
Christl Mardayn as Toni
Hans Moser as K.u.K. stove heater Stockel
Lola Chlud as Empress Maria Theresa
Annie Rosar as Frau Stockel
Rudolf Carl as Egelseder
Wilhelm Schich as Oysberger  
Beppo Brem as Gaisberger  
Karl Hellmer as Sikora
Oskar Sima as Sergeant
Hansjörg Adolfi as Richter Wögerl
Eduard Kandl as Badelhartinger
Julius Brandt
Helga Demmer
Rudolf Essek
Josef Herrgesell
Helene Lauterböck 
Kurt von Lessen
Heinz Martini
Karl Meixner
Hanns Obonya
Klaus Pohl 
Josef Reithofer 
Betty Sedlmayr
Walter Simlinger as Heurigensänger  
Ernst Baebler as Heurigensänger 
Maria Paudler

References

External links

1930s historical comedy films
German historical comedy films
Films of Nazi Germany
Films directed by Gustav Ucicky
UFA GmbH films
Films set in the 18th century
German multilingual films
German black-and-white films
1934 multilingual films
1930s German films
Films set in Vienna
Films shot in Vienna
Films shot at Babelsberg Studios